Cheapass Games is a game company founded and run by game designer James Ernest, based in Seattle, Washington. Cheapass Games operates on the philosophy that most game owners have plenty of dice, counters, play money, and other common board game accessories, so there is no need to bundle all of these components with every game that requires them. Cheapass games thus come packaged in white envelopes, small boxes, or plastic resealable bags containing only those components unique to the game - typically a rules sheet, a playing board printed on card stock, and game cards banded by magazine-cutout "sleeves". This allows the company to produce games for prices well below the market average.  Later, Cheapass started offering some higher-quality, full color games under the "James Ernest Games" brand.

History
Ernest originally developed the idea for selling basic games without all the common components while freelancing at Wizards of the Coast during the 1990s. However, Wizards rejected the idea, and in 1995, Ernest quit and started up the company.  Creating the games by hand, he initially showed the games at tradeshows and conventions, resulting in sales demand from game stores.  The company creates and assembles each game pack by hand, with most games only being made in runs of up to 5,000 copies.

Cheapass Games and James Ernest have won several awards for game design including the 2002 Origins Award for best play-by-mail game (Button Men Web Game),
the 2002 Origins Vanguard Award (Diceland), the 1997 Origins Award for best abstract board game (Kill Doctor Lucky), and the 1997 Origins Award for best traditional card game (Give Me the Brain). 

Cheapass' game Pennywise was awarded the parodic 2003 "Spud des Jahres" award for most overpriced game by the website Spielboy (see Spiel des Jahres).

In 2004, the indie band Beatnik Turtle released The Cheapass Album, an album inspired by games from Cheapass Games.

In October 2007, Cheapass Games stopped updating their web site; a message on the homepage explains: "Cheapass Games is in the process of hibernating, which means we can be a bit sluggish and hard to reach. Most of us have moved on to better careers, and James Ernest is slumbering peacefully in a warm hole in the ground."

In 2009, Cheapass created a Button Men app for the iPhone. Paizo Publishing is selling some Cheapass games on its website.

In 2011, Cheapass Games resumed updating their website with a new business model: Games are being released for free in PDF format for gamers to print and play, and customers are asked to donate a dollar or two if they like the game. James Ernest says, in the game rules, "I've decided to try a different gamble. I'm giving my games away for free. This way, you can read the rules, make a copy, and even play the thing, before you decide what it's worth. If you do like my games, I hope you will send me some money. But I'm also hoping you will share this experiment with your friends. You are my sales force, my marketing department, my demo team." New games are usually accompanied by the Ransomometer, where potential customers are encouraged to donate a certain dollar amount before a game is released to the public.

In 2012, Cheapass Games offered their first Kickstarter project, a deluxe reprint of their previous game Unexploded Cow. This was followed in 2013 by another Kickstarter project for a deluxe version of their earlier Deadwood game, called Deadwood Studios USA.

In 2019, it was announced that Greater Than Games had acquired Cheapass Games. They have since opened a website with many free PDF offerings of older Cheapass Games titles.

List of Cheapass Games 
Several of the older games are out of print but are offered for free by Cheapass: the cards, rules, or other game materials may be downloaded for free, and Cheapass requests that if the recipient likes the game he or she should make a voluntary payment. Cheapass Games provides a chart of suggested donations based on the recipient's profession/income level at their website. 

 Before I Kill You, Mr. Bond (a game of attracting interesting people to your lair, then killing them. Reissued in 2004 as James Ernest's Totally Renamed Spy Game)
 Ben Hurt (An out of print game involving betting and chariot races)
 The Big Idea (A game involving venture capitalism and marketing)
 Bitin' Off Hedz (A simple game of dinosaurs and rocks)
 Bleeding Sherwood (An out of print game with a Robin Hood theme available for download)
 Brawl (A real-time card game)
 Button Men (A collectible button-and-dice game, sold in sets of two to six buttons)
 Captain Park's Imaginary Polar Expedition (A game of faking travels)
 Captain Treasure Boots
 The Chief Herman games:
 Chief Herman's Holiday Fun Pack
 Chief Herman's Next Big Thing
 Deadwood (A game of bad actors)
 The Devil Bunny games:
 Devil Bunny Needs a Ham (A game of buildings and Devil Bunny)
 Devil Bunny Hates the Earth (A game of squirrels, taffy machines, and Devil Bunny)
 Diceland (A collectible cardboard dice game. Multiple sets)
 The Digital Eel video games
 Plasmaworm
 Strange Adventures in Infinite Space
 Dr. Blob's Organism
 Big Box of Blox
 Boiler Plate Special
 The Doctor Lucky games:
 Kill Doctor Lucky (A game of killing and not being seen)
 Kill Doctor Lucky—Craigdarroch (Another place to kill)
 Save Doctor Lucky (A game of saving and being seen)
 Save Doctor Lucky on Moon Base Copernicus (Another place to save)
 Enemy Chocolatier
 Escape from Elba (An out of print game of many d6 and spelling weapons)
 Falling (An out of print real time game about falling to your death)
 Fightball (A real-time card game about a futuristic sport) designed with Mike Selinker
 Fight City (A trading card game of gangs and cards)
 Fish Cook
 Freeloader (A game about borrowing all that you can)
 The Friedey's games:
 Give Me the Brain (A game of zombies and their jobs) Origins Award winner for Best Traditional Card Game of 1997
 Lord of the Fries (A game of zombies and fast food orders)
 Change! (An out of print game of zombies and money)
 The Great Brain Robbery (A game of zombies and train robbery) Origins Award winner for Best Science Fiction or Fantasy Board Game 2000
 Dead Money (A game of zombies, the wild west and losing at poker)
 Get Out (A game of finding work)
 Girl Genius: The Works (A game of Phil Foglio's Girl Genius comic)
 The Grave Robber games:
 Parts Unknown (An out of print game of mad scientists and economics)
 Renfield (An out of print game that plays like a combination of Poker and Hearts.  Available for download)
 The Hip Pocket games:
 Agora (A game of market stalls)
 The Big Cheese (A small bidding game featuring mice and dice)
 Cube Farm (A game of cubicle layout)
 Light Speed (A real-time card game about mining spaceships)
 Nexus (A game of nodes)
 Safari Jack Remix (A game of tracking animals)
 Steam Tunnel (A game of tunnel control)
 TimeLine (A game of time travel)
 The Very Clever Pipe Game (A game of connecting pipes)
 Huzzah! (A game of Renaissance Fairs.  Available for download)
 Jacob Marley, Esq. (A game of loans)
 James Ernest Writes Off Another Trip to VEGAS (An out of print game of casinos and cheating)
 Landyland (A promotional game using Magic: The Gathering'''s basic lands)
 Mana Burn (An out of print promotional game using Magic: The Gathering cards)
 The One False Step games:
 One False Step for Mankind (A game of getting to the moon)
 One False Step Home (A game of getting back from the moon)
 Pairs (card game) (A game with a nontraditional triangular deck)
 Punch Cards (A game for conventions)
 Secret Tijuana Deathmatch (A game of buying the contracts of illegitimate wrestlers and pitting them against each other)
 Spree! (A game of firearms and larceny)
 Starbase Jeff (An out of print game of gambling in space)
 Tak (An abstract strategy game based on a game introduced in Patrick Rothfuss's book, The Wise Man's Fear)
 U.S. Patent No. 1 (A game of racing through time to get the first patent issued)
 Unexploded Cow (A game of marching mad cows through bomb fields)
 Veritas
 Witch Trial (A game of pressing the innocent to death with stones)

Reviews
Backstab #12

References

External links 

 Official Button Men website
 Cheapass Games for Sale on the Paizo Website
 

Board game publishing companies
Card game publishing companies
Companies based in Seattle